KVOI (1030 AM)  is a commercial radio station licensed to serve the Tucson, Arizona area. The station airs news/talk programming. Previously, the station broadcast at 690 kHz until a 2009 frequency swap with KCEE.

The transmitters of KVOI is located in West Massingale Road. At day, it operates a 10,000 power to protect any interference with class A clear channel stations, such as WBZ in Boston, Massachusetts. At night, it reduces the power to 1,000 to avoid any interference. 

Weekday programs on KVOI include: Wake Up Tucson, Winn Tucson with Kathleen Winn, Bill Buckmaster, Hugh Hewitt, Dennis Prager, Kate Delaney and Tom Sullivan.

History
The station went on the air as KEVT on March 7, 1990. On January 11, 2007, the station changed its call sign to KCEE. On July 1, 2009, the station swapped formats and call signs with 690 AM in Tucson, becoming KVOI.

In July 2018, Good News Communications agreed to sell KVOI to Bustos Media; the sale was consummated on October 31, 2018.

References

External links
 Official Website

VOI
Talk radio stations in the United States
Radio stations established in 1990